Marc Alexander Scheer (born 16 May 1979) is a German sprinter who specializes in the 400 metres.

He finished fourth at the 1998 World Junior Championships. In 4 × 400 metres relay he finished fifth at the 1998 World Cup and eighth at the 2001 World Championships.

References

1979 births
Living people
German male sprinters
Place of birth missing (living people)
21st-century German people